National Rally is a political party in France.

National Rally may also refer to:
National Rally (Belgium), a former political party in Belgium
Rassemblement National Français ('French National Rally'), a former political party in France

See also
National Popular Rally, a former political party in Vichy France
, a political party in Quebec, Canada